Chitra, also spelled as Citra, is an Indian genre of art that includes painting, sketch and any art form of delineation. The earliest mention of the term Chitra in the context of painting or picture is found in some of the ancient Sanskrit texts of Hinduism and Pali texts of Buddhism.

Nomenclature
Chitra (IAST: Citra, चित्र) is a Sanskrit word that appears in the Vedic texts such as hymns 1.71.1 and 6.65.2 of the Rigveda. There, and other texts such as Vajasaneyi Samhita, Taittiriya Samhita, Satapatha Brahmana and Tandya Brahmana, Chitra means "excellent, clear, bright, colored, anything brightly colored that strikes the eye, brilliantly ornamented, extraordinary that evokes wonder". In the Mahabharata and the Harivamsa, it means "picture, sktech, dilineation", and is presented as a genre of kala (arts). Many texts generally dated to the post-4th-century BCE period, use the term Chitra in the sense of painting, and Chitrakara as a painter. For example, the Sanskrit grammarian Panini in verse 3.2.21 of his Astadhyayi highlights the word chitrakara in this sense. Halls and public spaces to display paintings are called chitrasalas, and the earliest known mention of these are found in the Ramayana and the Mahabharata.

A few Indian regional texts such as Kasyapa silpa refer to painting by others words. For example, abhasa – which literally means "semblance, shining forth",  is used in Kasyapa-shilpa to mean as a broader category of painting, of which chitra is one of three types. The verses in section 4.4 of the Kasyapa-silpa state that there are three types of images – those which are immovable (walls, floor, terracota, stucco), movable, and those which are both movable-immovable (stone, wood, gems). In each of these three, states Kasyapa-shipa, are three classes of expression – ardhacitra, citra, and citra-abhasa. Ardhacitra is an art form where a high relief is combined with painting and parts of the body is not seen (it appears to be emerging out of the canvas). The Citra is the form of picture artwork where the whole is represented with or without integrating a relief. Citrabhasha is the form where an image is represented on a canvas or wall with colors (painting). However, states Commaraswamy, the word Abhasa has other meanings depending on the context. For example, in Hindu texts on philosophy, it implies the "field of objective experience" in the sense of the intellectual image internalized by a person during a reading of a subject (such as an epic, tale or fiction), or one during a meditative spiritual experience.

In some Buddhist and Hindu texts on methods to prepare a manuscript (palm leaf) or a composition on a cloth, the terms lekhya and alekhya are also used in the context of a chitra. More specifically, alekhya is the space left while writing a manuscript leaf or cloth, where the artist aims to add a picture or painting to illustrate the text.

History

The earliest explicit reference to painting in an Indian text is found in verse 4.2 of the Maitri Upanishad where it uses the phrase citrabhittir or "like a painted wall". The Indian art of painting is also mention in a number of Buddhist Pali suttas, but with the modified spelling of Citta. This term is found in the context of either a painting, or painter, or painted-hall (citta-gara) in Majjhima Nikaya 1.127, Samyutta Nikaya 2.101 and 3.152, Vinaya 4.289 and others. Among the Jain texts, it is mentioned in Book 2 of the Acaranga Sutra as it explains that Jaina monk should not indulge in the pleasures of watching a painting.

The Kamasutra, broadly accepted to have been complete by about the 4th-century CE, recommends that the young man should surprise the girl he courts with gifts of color boxes and painted scrolls. The Viddhasalabhanjika – another Hindu kama- and kavya–text uses chitra-simile in  verse 1.16, as "pictures painted by the god of love, with the brush of the mind and the canvas of the heart".

The nature of a chitra (painting), how the viewer's mind projects a two dimensional artwork into a three dimensional representation, is used by Asanga in Mahayana Sutralamkara – a 3rd to 5th-century Sanskrit text of the Mahayana Buddhist tradition, to explain "non-existent imagination" as follows:

According to Yoko Taniguchi and Michiyo Mori, the art of painting the caves at the c. 6th-century Buddhas of Bamiyan site in Afghanistan, destroyed by the Taliban Muslims in the late 1990s, were likely introduced to this region from India along with the literature on early Buddhism.

Texts
There are many important dedicated Indian treatises on chitra. Some of these are chapters within a larger encyclopedia-like text. These include:
Chitrasutras, chapters 35–43 within the Hindu text Vishnudharmottara Purana (the standard, and oft referred to text in the Indian tradition)
Chitralaksana of Nagnajit (a classic on classical painting, 5th-century CE or earlier making it the oldest known text on Indian painting; but the Sanskrit version has been lost, only version available is in Tibet and it states that it is a translation of a Sanskrit text)
Samarangana Sutradhara (mostly architecture treatise, contains a large section on paintings)
Aparajitaprccha (mostly architecture treatise, contains a large section on paintings)
Manasollasa (an encyclopedia, contains chapters on paintings)
Abhilashitartha chinatamani
Sivatatva ratnakara
Chitra Kaladruma
Silpa ratna
Narada silpa
Sarasvati silpa
Prajapati silpa
Kasyapa silpa

These and other texts on chitra not only discuss the theory and practice of painting, some of them include discussions on how to become a painter, the diversity and the impact of a chitra on viewers, of aesthetics, how the art of painting relates to other arts (kala), methods of preparing the canvas or wall, methods and recipes to make color pigments. For example, the 10th-century Chitra Kaladruma presents recipe for making red color paint from the resin of lac insects. Other colors for the historic frescoes found in India, such as those in the Ajanta Caves, were obtained from nature. They mention earthy and mineral (inorganic) colorants such as yellow and red ochre, orpigment, green celadonite and ultramarine blue (lapis lazuli). The use of organic colorants prepared per a recipe in these texts have been confirmed through residue analysis and modern chromatographic techniques.

Theory
The Indian concepts of painting are described in a range of texts called the shilpa shastras. These typically begin by attributing this art to divine sources such as Vishvakarma and ancient rishis (sages) such as Narayana and Nagnajit, weaving some mythology, highlighting chitra as a means to express ideas and beauty along with other universal aspects, then proceed to discuss the theory and practice of painting, sketching and other related arts. Manuscripts of many these texts are found in India, while some are known to be lost but are found outside India such as in Tibet and Nepal. Among these are the Citrasutras in the 6th-century Visnudharmottara Purana manuscripts discovered in India, and the Citralaksana manuscript discovered in Tibet (lost in India). This theory include early Indian ideas on how to prepare a canvas or substrate, measurement, proportion, stance, color, shade, projection, the painting's interaction with light, the viewer, how to captivate the mind, and other ideas.

According to the historic Indian tradition, a successful and impactful painting and painter requires a knowledge of the subject – either mythology or real life, as well as a keen sense of observation and knowledge of nature, human behavior, dance, music, song and other arts. For example, section 3.2 of Visnudharmottara Purana discusses these requirements and the contextual knowledge needed in chitra and the artist who produces it. The Chitrasutras in the Vishnudharmottara Purana state that the sculpture and painting arts are related, with the phrase "as in Natya, so in Citra". This relationship links them in rasa (aesthetics) and as forms of expression.

The painting

A chitra is a form of expression and communication. According to Aparajitaprccha – a 12th-century text on arts and architecture, just like the water reflects the moon, a chitra reflects the world. It is a rupa (form) of how the painter sees or what the painter wants the viewer to observe or feel or experience.

A good painting is one that is alive, breathing, draws in and affects the viewer. It captivates the minds of viewers, despite their diversity. Installed in a sala (hall or room), it enlivens the space.

The ornaments of a painting are its lines, shading, decoration and colors, states the 6th-century Visnudharmottara Purana. It states that there are eight gunas (merits, features) of a chitra that the artist must focus on: (1) posture; (2) proportion; (3) the use of the plumb line; (4) charm; (5) detail (how much and where); (6) verisimilitude; (7) kshaya (loss, foreshortening) and; (8) vrddhi (gain). Among the dosas (demerits, faults) of a painting and related arts, states Chitrasutra, are lines that are weak or thick, absence of variety, errors in scale (oversized eyes, lips, cheeks), inconsistency across the canvas, deviations from the rules of proportion, improper posture or sentiment, and non-merging of colors.

Limbs of a painting
Two historical sets called "chitra anga", or "limbs of painting" are found in Indian texts. According to the Samarangana Sutradhara – an 11th-century Sanskrit text on Hindu architecture and arts, a painting has eight limbs: 
Vartika – manufacture of brushes
Bhumibandhana – preparation of base, plaster, canvas
Rekhakarma – sketching
Varnakarma – coloring
Vartanakarma – shading
lekhakarana – outlining
Dvikakarma – second and final lining
Lepyakarma – final coating

According to Yashodhara's Jayamangala, a Sanskrit commentary on Kamasutra, there are sadanga (six limbs) in the art of alekhyam and chitra (drawing and painting):
Rupa-bhedah, or form distinction; this requires a knowledge of characteristic marks, diversity, manifested forms that distinguish states of something in the same genus/class
Pramanani, or measure; requires knowledge of measurement and proportion rules (talamana)
Bhava yojanam, or emotion and its joining with other parts of the painting; requires understanding and representing the mood of the subject
Lavanya yojanam, or rasa, charm; requires understanding and representing the inner qualities of the subject
Sadrsyam, or resemblance; requires knowledge of visual correspondence across the canvas
Varnika-bhanga or color-pigment-analysis; requires knowledge how colors distribute on the canvas and how they visually impact the viewer

These six limbs are arranged stylistically in two ways. First as a set of compound (Rupa-bhedah and Varnika-bhanda), a set of joining (middle two yojnam), and a set of single words (Pramanani and Sadrsyam). Second, states Victor Mair, the six limbs in this Hindu text are paired in a set of differentiation skills (first two), then a pair of aesthetic skills, and finally a pair of technical skills. These limbs parallel the 12th-century Six principles of Chinese painting of Xie He.{{refn|group=note|The Hua Chi of Teng Ch'un, a 12th-century Chinese text, mentions the Buddhist temple of Nalanda with frescoes about the Buddha painted inside. It states that the Indian Buddhas look different from those painted by Chinese, as the Indian paintings have Buddha with larger eyes, their ears are curiously stretched and the Buddhas have their right shoulder bare. It then states that the artists first make a drawing of the picture, then paint a vermilion or gold colored base. It also mentions the use of ox-glue and a gum produced from peach trees and willow juice, with the artists preferring the latter. According to Coomaraswamy, the ox-glue in the Indian context mentioned in the Chinese text is probably the same as the recipe found in the Sanskrit text Silparatna, one where the base medium is produced from boiling buffalo skin in milk, followed by drying and blending process.

The six limbs in Jayamangala likely reflect the earliest and more established Hindu tradition for chitra. This is supported by the Chitrasutras found in the Vishnudharmottara Purana. They explicitly mention pramanani and lavanya as key elements of a painting, as well as discuss the other four of the six limbs in other sutras. The Chitrasutra chapters are likely from about the 4th or 5th-century. Numerous other Indian texts touch upon the elements or aspects of a chitra.  For example, the Aparajitaprccha states that the essential elements of a painting are: citrabhumi (background), the rekha (lines, sketch), the varna (color), the vartana (shading), the bhusana (decoration) and the rasa (aesthetic experience).

The painter

The painter (chitrakara, rupakara) must master the fundamentals of measurement and proportions, state the historic chitra texts of India. According to these historic texts, the expert painter masters the skills in measurement, characteristics of subjects, attributes, form, relative proportion, ornament and beauty, states Isabella Nardi – a scholar known for her studies on chitra text and traditions of India. According to the Chitrasutras, a skilled painter needs practice, and is one who is able to paint neck, hands, feet, ears of living beings without ornamentation, as well as paint water waves, flames, smoke, and garments as they get affected by the speed of wind. He paints all types of scenes, ranging from dharma, artha and kama. A painter observes, then remembers, repeating this process till his memory has all the details he needs to paint, states Silparatna. According to Sivatattva Ratnakara, he is well versed in sketching, astute with measurements, skilled in outlining (hastalekha), competent with colors, and ready to diligently mix and combine colors to create his chitra. The painter is a creative person, with an inner sense of rasa (aesthetics).

The viewer
The painter should consider the diversity of viewers, states the Indian tradition of chitra. The experts and critics with much experience with paintings study the lines, shading and aesthetics, the uninitiated visitors and children enjoy the vibrancy of colors, while women tend to be attracted to the ornamentation of form and the emotions. A successful painter tends to captivate a variety of minds. A painter should remember that the visual and aesthetic impact of a painting triggers different responses in different audiences.

The Silparatna – a Sanskrit text on the arts, states that the painting should reflect its intended place and purpose. A theme suitable for a palace or gateway is different from that in a temple or the walls of a home. Scenes of wars, misery, death and suffering are not suitable paintings within homes, but these can be important in a chitrasala (museum with paintings). Auspicious paintings with beautiful colors such as those that cheer and enliven a room are better for homes, states Silparatna.

Practice
According to the art historian Percy Brown, the painting tradition in India is ancient and the persuasive evidence are the oldest known murals at the Jogimara caves. The mention of chitra and related terms in the pre-Buddhist Vedic era texts, the chitra tradition is much older. It is very likely, states Brown, the pre-Buddhist structures had paintings in them. However, the primary building material in ancient India was wood, the colors were organic materials and natural pigments, which when combined with the tropical weather in India would naturally cause the painting to fade, damage and degrade over the centuries. It is not surprising, therefore, that sample paintings and historic evidence for chitra practice are unusual. The few notable surviving examples of chitra are found hidden in caves, where they would be naturally preserved a bit better, longer and would be somewhat protected from the destructive effects of wind, dust, water and biological processes.

Some notable, major surviving examples of historic paintings include:
Murals at Jogimara cave (eight panels of murals, with a Brahmi inscription, 2nd or 1st century BCE, Hindu), oldest known ceiling paintings in India in remote Ramgarh hills of northern Chhattisgarh, below on wall of this cave is a Brahmi inscription in Magadhi language about a girl named Devadasi and a boy named Devadina (either they were lovers and wrote a love-graffiti per one translation, or they were partners who together converted natural caves here into a theatre with painted walls per another translation)
Mural at Sitabhinji Group of Rock Shelters (c. 400 CE Ravanachhaya mural with an inscription, near a Shiva temple in remote Odisha, a non-religious painting), the oldest surviving example of a tempera painting in eastern states of India

Murals at Ajanta caves (Jataka tales, Buddhist), 5th-century CE, Maharashtra
Murals at Badami Cave Temples (Hindu), 6th-century CE, Karnataka (secular paintings along with one of the earliest known painting of a Hindu legend about Shiva and Parvati inside a Vaishnava cave)
Murals at Bagh caves (Hallisalasya dance, Buddhist or Hindu), Madhya Pradesh
Murals at Ellora caves (Flying vidyadharas, Jain), Maharashtra
Frescoes at Sittanavasal cave (Nature scenes likely representing places of Tirthankara sermons, Jain), Tamil Nadu
Frescoes at Thirunadhikkara cave temple (Flowers and a woman, likely a scene of puja offering to Ganesha, another of Vishnu, Hindu), Travancore region, Kerala-Tamil Nadu
Paintings at the Brihadisvara temple (Dancer, Hindu), Tamil Nadu
Manuscript paintings (numerous states such as Gujarat, Kashmir, Kerala, Odisha, Assam; also Nepal, Tibet; Buddhist, Jain, Hindu)
Vijayanagara temples (Hindu), Karnataka
Chidambaram temple (Hindu), Tamil Nadu
Chitrachavadi (Hindu, a choultry–mandapa near Madurai with Ramayana frescoes)
Pahari paintings (Hindu), Himachal Pradesh and nearby regions
Rajput paintings (Hindu), Rajasthan
Deccan paintings (Hindu, Jain)
Kerala paintings (Hindu)
Telangana paintings (Hindu)
Mughal paintings (Indo-Islamic)

Contemporary culture

Kalamkari (Hindu)
Pattas (Jain, Hindu)

See also
Rasa (aesthetics)
Classical Indian music
Classical Indian dance

Notes

References

Bibiliogaphy 

 

 

 
 

 

 

Painting
Buddhist art
Hindu art
Jain art